Mohammed Al-Motawaa (born 6 October 1994) is a footballer who plays as a forward.

External links 
 

1994 births
Living people
Khaleej FC players
Ohod Club players
Al-Nairyah Club players
Saudi Arabian footballers
Saudi First Division League players
Saudi Professional League players
Saudi Second Division players
Association football forwards
Saudi Arabian Shia Muslims